David Fullerton (October 4, 1772February 1, 1843) was an American politician from Pennsylvania who served as a Democratic-Republican member of the U.S. House of Representatives for Pennsylvania's 5th congressional district from 1819 to 1820.

Biography
David Fullerton was born in the Cumberland Valley of the Province of Pennsylvania, near Greencastle to Humphrey and Martha (Mitchell) Fullerton.  He is the uncle of David Fullerton Robison, the U.S. Congressman from Pennsylvania.  He served in the War of 1812 with the rank of Major.  He settled in Greencastle and engaged in mercantile pursuits and banking. He owned slaves as well.

Fullerton was elected as a Democratic-Republican to the Sixteenth Congress and served until his resignation on May 15, 1820.  He was not a candidate for renomination.  He resumed mercantile pursuits and banking.

He served as an Anti-Masonic member of the Pennsylvania State Senate for the 15th district from 1827 to 1838 and the 14th district from 1839 to 1840.  He died in Greencastle in 1843 and was interred in Cedar Hill Cemetery.

Footnotes

Sources

The Political Graveyard

|-

1772 births
1843 deaths
People from Franklin County, Pennsylvania
Democratic-Republican Party members of the United States House of Representatives from Pennsylvania
Anti-Masonic Party politicians from Pennsylvania
Pennsylvania state senators
American bankers
American slave owners
People from Pennsylvania in the War of 1812
Burials in Pennsylvania